Booroomba Rocks is a granite area in Namadgi National Park, in the Australian Capital Territory, particularly noted for its slab climbing. The rocks are divided into several areas, the most prominent being North Buttress, Middle Rocks, and South Buttress.

It is also known for its botany. 

The area was first approached from Booroomba Station. However, it was not until Honeysuckle Creek Tracking Station, and the associated Apollo Road were opened, that the area became feasible as a climbing area.

See also
Geology of the Australian Capital Territory.

References

External links
Booroomba at the Climbing Australia website 

Geography of the Australian Capital Territory
Climbing areas of Australia